The Cleveland, Akron and Columbus Railroad (nicknamed the "Blue Grass Route of Ohio") was a railroad company in the U.S. state of Ohio.  It connected its namesake cities and served as a vital link for later parent Pennsylvania Railroad to connect between Cleveland and Columbus, Ohio.

History 

The company was formed through a reorganization of the Cleveland, Mount Vernon and Delaware Railroad on December 7, 1881, as the Cleveland, Akron and Columbus Railroad. It was rumored in 1881 that the line might become part of the Baltimore and Ohio Railroad system, as officials of that company had made visits to the property at the time. The reorganization became effective on December 31, 1885, with the first trains running under the new name on January 1, 1886.

Rumors of control by the Pennsylvania Railroad floated in the mid-1890s, with control of the CA&C ultimately gained in 1899.  The CA&C merged with the Cincinnati and Muskingum Valley Railroad in 1911.  Passenger services on the line ended on December 14, 1950.

Notes

Footnotes

References

External links 
 Cleveland, Akron & Columbus Railway Company Annual Report for the Fiscal Year Ending June 30th, 1890 New York Public Library

Defunct Ohio railroads
Predecessors of the Pennsylvania Railroad
Railway companies established in 1881